Nactus kunan is an extant species of slender-toe geckos described in 2012, and indigenous to the Admiralty Islands of Papua New Guinea. It is brightly coloured, and its specific name means "bumblebee" in the local Nali language.

Distribution and habitat
The species is only known from two specimens collected from a village on Manus Island, the Admiralty Islands. It is expected to occur more widely in the highlands of Manus Island where forest patches remain. The specimens were collected from village house structures in small openings in the forest at night.

Description
Nactus kunan is brightly coloured with a pattern of broad alternating dark (black or dark brown) and golden yellow bands on neck, trunk, and tail. It also has a unique head pattern among Nactus: a sharply contrasting 
yellow crown and eyelids on a black background.

Nactus kunan appears to be bisexual, unlike Nactus pelagicus, the only other Nactus species of the Admiralty Islands. The holotype, an adult female, measured  in snout–vent length, with an equally long tail. The other known individual was a juvenile female. Its duller colouration suggests that the species undergoes an ontogenetic colour shift at maturation.

References

Bibliography

Nactus
Reptiles described in 2012
Reptiles of Papua New Guinea
Endemic fauna of Papua New Guinea
Geckos of New Guinea